The 2006–07 AHL season was the 71st season of the American Hockey League. Twenty-seven teams played 80 games each in the schedule. The Hamilton Bulldogs won their first Calder Cup, defeating the defending champions, the Hershey Bears in the finals.

Team changes
The Lowell Lock Monsters  are purchased by the New Jersey Devils, and renamed the Lowell Devils.
The Cleveland Barons are relocated to Worcester, Massachusetts and renamed the Worcester Sharks, playing in the Atlantic Division.
The Albany River Rats shift from the Atlantic Division to the East Division.

Rules changes
The league mandated that players wear a hockey helmet with a visor, following research on eye injuries by Mayo Clinic physician Michael Stuart.

Final standings
Note: GP = Games played; W = Wins; L = Losses; OTL = Overtime losses; SL = Shootout losses; GF = Goals for; GA = Goals against; Pts = Points;

Eastern Conference

Western Conference

Scoring leaders

Note: GP = Games played; G = Goals; A = Assists; Pts = Points; PIM = Penalty minutes

Leading goaltenders
Note: GP = Games played; Mins = Minutes played; W = Wins; L = Losses; SL = Shootout losses; GA = Goals allowed; SO = Shutouts; GAA = Goals against average

Calder Cup Playoffs

All Star Classic
The 20th AHL All-Star Classic was played on January 29, 2007 at the Ricoh Coliseum in Toronto, Ontario. Team PlanetUSA defeated Team Canada 7-6. In the skills competition held the night before, Team PlanetUSA defeated Team Canada 19-14.

Trophy and award winners

Team awards

Individual awards

Other awards

See also
List of AHL seasons
2006 in ice hockey
2007 in ice hockey

References

External links
AHL official site
AHL Hall of Fame
HockeyDB

 
American Hockey League seasons
2
2